Broken Promises may refer to:

 Broken Promises (album), a 2000 EP by Allen Crane
 Broken Promises (Agents of S.H.I.E.L.D.), a 2017 episode of Agents of S.H.I.E.L.D.
 "Broken Promises", a song from the album Element Eighty by Element Eighty
 "Broken Promises", a song by the Tom Tom Club from Boom Boom Chi Boom Boom
 "Broken Promises", a 2001 single by Tonya Mitchell
 "Broken Promises", a song by Summer Walker from Still Over It
"Broken Promises", a song by Moments in Grace

See also 
 Election promise
Broken Promise